Britannia Depicta was an illustrated road atlas for Britain. It was printed in numerous editions over many decades from 1720 into the 19th century and updated with engravings by many artisans who worked from drawings of other artists. It featured strip maps.

The atlas was based on the earlier work of John Ogilby who published the first British road atlas in 1675. Britannia Depicta was printed in 1720 by Emanuel Bowen and John Owen's firm Bowen & Owen. It was one of Bowen's earliest works. 

A road atlas, it contains two hundred and seventy three road maps along with drawings of landmarks and miniature county maps of each of the counties of England and Wales. It followed on John Ogilby's original with updated style of historical and heraldic detail. It was an unusual feature of the atlas that the maps were engraved on both sides of each page, and this resulted in a handier-sized book.

Cadell & Davies editions

Cadell & Davies published its own editions of the Britannia Depicta atlas over many years, with accompanying descriptions by Samuel Lysons. Engraved plates for their Britannia Depicta are dated 1803–1818. 

The Quarterly Review of 1816 reported it was ordered along with Magna Britannia.

Landscapes by Joseph Farington were included in Cadell and Davies' six-volume "modernisation" of the illustrated atlas. His contributions include topographical Views in Cornwall (1814) and other views. He also depicted Devon for a 7th edition and had his drawings engraved but they were never published.

Engravers
Engravers who worked on the Cadell & Davies editions include:

 William Angus (engraver) 1752–1821
 M. S. Barenger
 John Byrne (engraver), 1786–1847
 Letitia Byrne 1779–1849
 William Byrne (engraver) 1743–1805
 George Cooke (engraver) 1781–1834
 Frederick Rudolph Hay 1784–?
 John Landseer 1769–1852
 Samuel Middiman ca. 1750–1831
 James Neagle 1760?–1822
 Charles Pye (engraver) 1777–1864
 John Pye 1782–1874
 John Scott (engraver) 1774–1827
 Thomas Woolnoth, 1785–1857
 William Woolnoth 1780–1837

Illustrators
Illustrations in the Cadell & Davies editions were made by artists including:

 William Alexander 1767–1816
 John Byrne 1786–1847
 Joseph Farington 1747–1821
 Thomas Hearne 1744–1817
 Frederick Nash 1782–1856
 John Powell, 1780-ca. 1833
 Robert Smirke 1752–1845
 John Smith (perhaps John Raphael Smith?)
 William Turner
 J. M. W. Turner (Joseph Mallord William), 1775–1851
 John Varley 1778–1842
 Thomas Webster 1800–1886

References

Maps of the United Kingdom
18th century in transport
18th-century books